The Wooster Korn Kings were a professional hockey team based in Wooster, Ohio. The Korn Kings were a member of the All American Hockey League and played their home games at Alice Noble Ice Arena in Wooster, OH. The team abruptly folded after two weeks of play.

Team history
The Wooster Korn Kings started their inaugural season in 2009 as the Madison Ice Muskies, located in Madison, Wisconsin. In October 2010, the team was relocated to Wooster, Ohio. They changed their name to the Wooster Korn Kings. The troubled franchise did not last long in the much smaller Wooster market, folding after just a bit more than a month after relocating.

References

External links
 Wooster Korn Kings website
 All-American Hockey League website

All American Hockey League (2008–2011) teams
Ice hockey teams in Ohio
2010 establishments in Ohio
2010 disestablishments in Ohio
Ice hockey clubs established in 2010
Sports clubs disestablished in 2010
Wayne County, Ohio